The Avro 626 is a single-engined British biplane trainer aircraft produced by Avro during the (1918-1939) inter-war period.

Design and development
The Model 626 was developed by Avro from the company's  Model 621 (Tutor) for export to smaller air forces, the idea being that the 626 would be a single aircraft that could carry out general aircrew training as well as a number of other roles. The types 621 and 626 were both two-seaters, but the latter had an additional cockpit behind the rear seat of the 621 and accessible from it. This additional cockpit was fitted with a Scarff ring for a machine gun and carried equipment for air navigation, wireless and gunnery training. Structurally and aerodynamically, it was almost identical to the Tutor: it had a conventional fabric-covered, metal airframe with single-bay wings.
Most of the 626s, like the Tutors had an Armstrong Siddeley Lynx IVC engine of 240 hp (180 kW), but most of those supplied to the Egyptian and Brazilian Air Forces used a 260 hp (190 kW) Cheetah V from the same maker.

The usual undercarriage used split, fixed mainwheels and either a tailskid or later a tailwheel, but some 621s appeared on floats and on skis.

The prototype was first flown in 1930.

Operational history
Avro employed an aggressive sales and marketing effort to introduce the Model 626 to customers throughout the world. An early production demonstration aircraft, marked G-ABFM  was sent by sea to South America in 1931. After demonstrations in Buenos Aires and a record-setting flight over the Andes, the aircraft was commandeered by Argentine military officials to help quell a local uprising. The 626 performed so well that an order was immediately placed for 14 additional aircraft. The biggest users were the Air Forces of Chile, Greece, and Portugal. Numerous sales were made to foreign air forces up to 1939, some of which survived in second-line service until 1945.

The 621 was not a civil type, though some did briefly appear on the civil registers of the UK (15) and Hong Kong (6). These markings were worn for testing, demonstration and export; only two civil machines stayed on the prewar U.K.register. After the war, two R.A.F. Prefects were civilianised, as was one in New Zealand.

Variants
 Avro 626: Two seat multi-purpose aircraft
 Avro Prefect: RAF and RNZAF name for the 626; in the period most RAF aircraft received names.  All RNZAF Prefects had three cockpits. All the  RAF machines were two-seat navigational training aircraft without the third cockpit installed.
 Avro 637: Armed patrol version of the Avro 626. Pilot had a .303 in (7.7 mm) Vickers machine gun mounted on the fuselage while the observer/gunner was armed with a .303 in (7.7 mm) Lewis Gun on an Avro low-drag mounting. This variant featured a slightly larger wingspan with rounded wingtips. Eight aircraft were sold to the Kwangsi Air Force (Government of South China) in China.
 Tatra T.126: Licence built 626, manufactured in Czechoslovakia; two versions proposed: one with 355 hp (265 kW) Avia Rk. 17 and export version for Turkey and the Balkans with a 260 hp (190 kW) Armstrong Siddeley Cheetah V. Only one built, possibly never flown because of the Munich crisis - factory was in the territory occupied by Germany.

Operators 

198 Avro 626s and Prefects were produced.

 Army Aviation Service received 15 aircraft.
 Austrian Air Force received seven aircraft.
 Belgian Air Force received 12 aircraft, two of which were still in service at the time of the German invasion in 1940.
 Brazilian Air Force received 16 aircraft.
 Royal Canadian Air Force received 12 aircraft. RCAF machines featured cold weather cowlings, enclosed cockpits and skis. They survived until early in the Second World War.
 3 Squadron RCAF
 111 squadron RCAF
 Chinese Nationalist Air Force - Probably received 13, certainly 11. May have built one itself. All served in the Second Sino-Japanese War.
 Chilean Air Force received 20 aircraft.
 Czechoslovak Air Force received one aircraft. Tatra under licence manufactured only one because of the Munich crisis.
 Royal Egyptian Air Force received 27 machines, their first military aircraft, as distinct from DH-60 Moths.  Only 25 served, as two were lost in delivery and replaced Egyptian 626s served from 1933 until 1944.
 Estonian Air Force received four aircraft.
 Hellenic Air Force received 21 aircraft which were in service at the time of the Italian invasion. Three machines escaped the fall of Greece to join the RAF in the desert.
 Irish Air Corps received four aircraft, which served until 1941.
 Lithuanian Air Force received three aircraft in 1937-1939. The type was still in service at the time of the Soviet invasion and occupation.
 Royal New Zealand Air Force received four Lynx-engined but three-cockpit Prefect aircraft for the RNZAF in 1935.
 No 1 Flying Training School.
 Portuguese Air Force and Portuguese Navy received 26 aircraft directly from Avro. A manufacturing licence was issued to the Portuguese factory OGMA, but it is not known how many were built by them.

Slovak Air Force

Spanish Republican Air Force operated uncertain number of aircraft in the Spanish Civil War. These did not come direct from Avro company.
 Royal Air Force received seven two-seater Prefects for air navigation training. Delivered in 1935, they operated during the Second World War on miscellaneous duties.

Survivors
NZ203, c/n 811, survived the war and was purchased by Mr. J. Frogley in 1948 who registered it as ZK-APC.The aircraft ceased flying in 1958 but in the 1980s it was acquired by the Royal New Zealand Air Force Museum and returned to the air. It is the sole surviving active Avro Prefect.

Specifications (Avro 626 (Lynx IVC landplane))

See also

Notes

References

Notes

Bibliography
 Gerdessen, Frederik. "Estonian Air Power 1918 – 1945". Air Enthusiast, No. 18, April – July 1982. pp. 61–76. .
 Jackson, A.J. Avro Aircraft since 1908, 2nd edition. London: Putnam Aeronautical Books, 1990. .
* Pacco, John. "Avro 626 'Prefect'" Belgisch Leger/Armee Belge: Het Militair Vliegwezen/l'Aeronautique Militaire 1930-1940. Aartselaar, Belgium: J.P. Publications, 2003, p. 83. .
 Němeček, V. Československá letadla 1918-1945. Praha: Naše Vojsko, 1983.

External links

RNZAF Museum Prefect page

1930s British military trainer aircraft
626
Single-engined tractor aircraft
Biplanes
Aircraft first flown in 1930